"Standing in the Shadows of Love" is a 1966 hit single recorded by the Four Tops for the Motown label. Written and produced by Motown's main production team Holland–Dozier–Holland, the song is one of the most well-known Motown tunes of the 1960s. A direct follow-up to the #1 hit "Reach Out I'll Be There" (even featuring a similar musical arrangement), "Standing in the Shadows of Love" reached #2 on the soul chart and #6 on the Billboard Hot 100 in 1967.  It also reached #6 in the UK.   Though the song was well-received, it has received some criticism. Author Martin Charles Strong notes that it rehashed the formula of "Reach Out I'll Be There" and achieved similar success by reaching the Top 10 in both the US and UK. It is ranked #470 on Rolling Stone's list of The 500 Greatest Songs of All Time in 2010 and #464 in 2004.

AllMusic critic John Bush calls "Standing in the Shadows of Love" "dramatic" and "impassioned."  Billboard described the song as a "solid rhythm rocker headed fast for the top."  Cash Box said the single is a "driving ode [that] is filled with a solid romance lyric in the quartet’s usual powerful style."  Critic Andrew Hamilton calls it a "memorable, unforgettable, timeless blast" which would have made Motown "notable" even if it was the only song Motown ever produced.  Hamilton remarks on the song's power to conjure up "mournful" emotions, and particularly highlights the coldness of lyrics such as "standing in the shadows of love getting ready for the heartaches to come."  Hamilton praises the intensity of Levi Stubbs' lead vocal and how it can make the listener believe that he is about to have a nervous breakdown.  Music critic Maury Dean describes the singer as waiting for his girlfriend to dump him and psyching himself for the blow and for getting ready for a new girlfriend.  He uses the metaphor of Wile E. Coyote to describe the singer's emotions as he waits for the "anvil to drop on his fervent love."

According to author Peter Benjaminson, "Standing in the Shadows of Love" is a reworked version of The Supremes' 1963 song "Standing at the Crossroads of Love", which was released as the B-side of their single "When the Lovelight Starts Shining Through His Eyes".

Personnel
 Lead vocals by Levi Stubbs
 Background vocals by Abdul "Duke" Fakir, Renaldo "Obie" Benson, Lawrence Payton, and The Andantes: Jackie Hicks, Marlene Barrow, and Louvain Demps
 Instrumentation by The Funk Brothers

References

External links
 Craig David interview by Pete Lewis, 'Blues & Soul' March 2010
 List of cover versions of "Standing in the Shadows of Love" at SecondHandSongs.com

1966 singles
1967 singles
Four Tops songs
Songs written by Holland–Dozier–Holland
Motown singles
1966 songs
Song recordings produced by Brian Holland
Song recordings produced by Lamont Dozier